Different Fur Studios (formerly Different Fur Trading Company) is a recording studio located in the Mission District area of San Francisco, California, at 3470 19th Street. Since 1968, Different Fur has recorded music from a wide range of artists, including major Grammy and Oscar-winning musicians as well as many important independent musicians.

History
Different Fur was founded in 1968 by the electronic music composer and keyboardist Patrick Gleeson and John Vieira. Its name was suggested by poet Michael McClure, while he was being recorded by Gleeson.  By the early 1970s Gleeson was doing sessions with Jefferson Starship on his recently acquired 8-track recorder and Moog synthesizer. It was his expertise in early synthesizers, like the Moog, which eventually led Gleeson to collaborations with Herbie Hancock, whom Gleeson credits with helping Different Fur get off the ground. By 1971 Gleeson was working with Hancock on his albums Crossings and Sextant. He went on to record many of the synthesizers on Hancock's master work Head Hunters, as well as several solo albums at Different Fur.

Gleeson eventually sold Different Fur in 1985.  However, it remains an active recording studio to this day. The studio is currently owned by Engineer Patrick Brown.

In February 2009, the relatively unknown and very recently signed to Fat Possum band Wavves filmed a video with bloggers yourstru.ly. The project was a three-part live filming of the two-piece band playing some of the songs off their new EP including "So Bored." While the original videos only received modest views after release, they marked the beginning of an ongoing partnership between Different Fur engineers and YoursTruly video producers that have resulted in live sessions with The Morning Benders, Chromeo, Little Dragon, Big K.R.I.T., Toro Y Moi, P.O.S, Girls, Freddie Gibbs, San Bruno's Death Cab For Cutie etc.

Artists who have recorded at Different Fur include Neil Young, Brian Eno, David Byrne, Devo, The Units, Kronos Quartet, Bobby Hutcherson, Primus, Rodrigo y Gabriela, The Morning Benders, Daniel Selby, Herbie Hancock, OneRepublic, Tristan Prettyman and music for Peanuts TV Specials have been recorded here.

Different Fur was featured in the SF Weekly Music section on June 15, 2011. The article focuses on work done with a number of local bands and artists.

Selected discography

2012
Sourpatch - Stagger and Fade
A B & The Sea - Constant Vacation
Lilac - Christine
The Park featuring Darondo and Happy Mayfield - The Silvercloud Time Machine (7")
Nate Mercereau - $1,000,000 Worth of Twang
Midi Matilda - Love & The Movies (single)
Starred - No Good (single)

2011
Dylan Fox and The Wave - Tunnel Vision
Bird Call - Other Creatures
A B & The Sea - Run Run Run!
NeaCombo Diffuzion - Round 2 Digital Attack
Lowered - (Mastering)
Alessandra - So Nice
The Park - 'The Process...The Park - These Are The DaysThe Park - Belleville (single)
Zodiac Death Valley - Zodiac Death ValleyLe Panique - Saturday MatineeLilac - LilacThe Cold Volts - People NoiseAsh Reiter - HeatwaveSkin & Bones featuring Izza Kizza and Bernie Worrell - Holdin' Back (single)
Skin & Bones - Stomp / Pop Painkillaz (remix) (single)

2010
Flexx Bronco - Volume 2: Off the RecordA B & The Sea - Boys and GirlsA B & The Sea - Christmas (Baby Please Come Home)The Morning Benders - Big EchoBig K.R.I.T. & Grillade - The Wuz Here SessionsMichael Franti & Spearhead - The Sound of SunshineGomorran Social Aid Club - The Gomorran Social Aid and Pleasure ClubThe Gomorrans - Giving Birth To LoveVictor Harris - Midnight at Malibu: The Essential Victor Harris (Omega Records)

2009
The Morning Benders - iTunes exclusiveTrainwreck Riders - The PerchA B & The Sea - Suzie/Yellow-Haired Girl (single)
So Many Wizards - TreeSkin & Bones featuring Chris Chu, Bernie Worrell, and 88 keys - Lemonade (single)

2008
Michael Franti & Spearhead - All Rebel RockersOneRepublic - Live Session (iTunes exclusive)
Loquat - Secrets Of The Sea (2008)
Tristan Prettyman - Live Session (iTunes exclusive)
Mister Loveless - Two WordsThe Morning Benders - Talking Through Tin CansThe Blakes - Live Session (iTunes exclusive)
Tegan and Sara - Live Session (iTunes exclusive)
Rupa & the April Fishes - Extraordinary RenditionLoCura - AnimasAlison Harris - Smoke rings in the skyMorley - SeenBig Light - Big LightAmos Lee - Live Session (iTunes exclusive)

2007
Black Lips - Live Session (iTunes exclusive)
Chow Nasty - Super Electrical RecordingsThe Mother Hips - Kiss the Crystal FlakeRodrigo y Gabriela - Live Session (iTunes exclusive)
Mew - Live Session (iTunes exclusive)
Jack Ingram - Live Session (iTunes exclusive)
Gomez - Live Session (iTunes exclusive)
Leni Stern - AfricaSpecimen - Electric BallroomJetboy - The Glam YearsThe Most Holy Trinity - Rituals for PartingGravy Train!!!! - All The Sweet StuffEarly 2000s (decade)
Transdub Massiv - Negril To Kingston CityRe:ignition - Empty Heart Loaded GunFM Fatale - Soft Life for KillersKarpov - SoliloquyEvening - Other VictoriansVienna Teng - Dreaming Through The NoiseHey Willpower - P.D.A. (US Bonus Track) (single)

1990s
Fantômas - FantômasMr. Bungle - CaliforniaSylvester - Step IIGeorge Winston - Linus & Lucy: The Music of Vince GuaraldiGeorge Winston - ForestGeorge Winston - SummerMr. Bungle - Mr. BunglePrimus - Sailing the Seas of CheeseAutopsy - Mental FuneralPrimus - Frizzle FryPhil Collins - Serious Hits... Live!1980s
Bobby Brown - Don't Be CruelEarth, Wind & Fire - Touch the WorldBrian Eno & David Byrne - My Life in the Bush of GhostsPatrick Gleeson - Rainbow DeltaKronos Quartet - SymbiosisJonathan Richman and The Modern Lovers - "Rockin' And Romance"
Joe Satriani - Flying in a Blue DreamDaniel Selby - Finishing TouchesWhispers - Just Gets Better with TimeGeorge Winston - Winter to SpringGeorge Winston - DecemberGeorge Winston - AutumnErasure - Dreamlike State (B side to Star)
Stevie Wonder - Characters1970s
Shigeru Suzuki - Band WagonDevo - Come Back Jonee and Shrivel-Up from Q. Are We Not Men? A: We Are Devo!Coke Escovedo - Comin' at YaCoke Escovedo - Disco FantasyPablo Cruise - A Place in the SunLenny White - Big CityPatrick Gleeson - Patrick Gleeson's Star WarsPatrick Gleeson - Beyond the Sun - An Electronic Portrait of Holst's "The Planets"Bobby Hutcherson - WaitingHerbie Hancock - ThrustHerbie Hancock - Head HuntersHerbie Hancock - SextantHerbie Hancock - CrossingsBrian Auger and the Oblivion Express - Happiness Heartaches''

References

External links
 Different Fur — official site

Mission District, San Francisco
Recording studios in California
Companies based in San Francisco
Music of the San Francisco Bay Area